The 2004–05 All-Ireland Senior Club Football Championship was the 35th staging of the All-Ireland Senior Club Football Championship since its establishment by the Gaelic Athletic Association in 1970-71. The championship began on 23 October 2004 and ended on 17 March 2004.

Caltra were the defending champions, however, they failed to qualify after being beaten by Salthill-Knocknacarra in the quarter-final of the 2004 Galway County Championship.

On 17 March 2005, Ballina Stephenites won the championship following a 1-12 to 2-08 defeat of Portlaoise in the All-Ireland final at Croke Park. It remains their only championship title.

Oisín McConville of Crossmaglen Rangers was the championship's top scorer with 3-20.

Results

Connacht Senior Club Football Championship

Quarter-final

Semi-finals

Final

Leinster Senior Club Football Championship

First round

Quarter-finals

Semi-finals

Final

Munster Senior Club Football Championship

Quarter-finals

Semi-finals

Final

Ulster Senior Club Football Championship

Preliminary round

Quarter-final

Semi-finals

Final

All-Ireland Senior Club Football Championship

Quarter-final

Semi-finals

Final

Championship statistics

Top scorers

Overall

In a single game

Miscellaneous
 Portlaoise became the first team to win six Leinster Club Championship titles.

References

2004 in Gaelic football
2005 in Gaelic football